Ian Daly (born 29 March 1990, in Dublin) is an Irish football player who plays for Cray Wanderers in the Isthmian League North Division.

Club career
Daly started his career with local club Broadford Rovers and spent two seasons at Home Farm FC, before joining Manchester City in July 2006. He was part of the Manchester City youth team that won the 2008 FA Youth Cup.

In July 2009, Daly joined Greek Super League team Aris Thessaloniki on a two-year contract. During his time at Aris, Daly worked with coach Hector Cuper who showed his trust in Daly by giving him the opportunity to play against teams such as Olympiakos and AEK Athens.
He played in a trial match for Bristol Rovers on 24 August 2010 at Cheltenham Town and scored a goal in a 1–0 win.
In August 2010, Cádiz CF of the Spanish Segunda División B announced the signing of Daly on transfer deadline day. Daly made his competitive debut on 14 November 2010 in 2–1 defeat to Lorca Atlético, but left the club by mutual consent on 28 January 2011.

St Patrick's Athletic
Daly signed for St Patrick's Athletic on a one-year deal on Monday 28 February 2011, given the number 24 shirt. He made his Pats debut in the away trip to Galway United when he came off the bench late on. Daly scored his first goal for Pats in a 2–0 win over Bray Wanderers in the Leinster Senior Cup at the Carlisle Grounds on 14 March 2011. Daly scored his first league goal away to Dundalk in the 69th minute to level the scores at 1–1 after coming on from the bench after 63 minutes. The Saints once again faced County Louth opposition the following Friday,  in the form of Drogheda United. Daly played the full game and scored the fourth goal in a 4–1 win at Hunky Dorys Park. Daly played a big part in Pats' 2011–12 UEFA Europa League campaign, setting up Dave McMillan's equalized away to FC Shakhter Karagandy in Kazakhstan, playing in all six games and scoring against ÍBV from Iceland in the first round. Daly signed a one-year extension to his contract to keep him at the club for the 2012 season. Daly's first goal of the 2012 season came in a 4–0 win over Phoenix in the Leinster Senior Cup at Richmond Park. He scored his second goal of the season in a 2–1 win over U.C.D in the 2012 League of Ireland Cup. Daly missed a penalty in the defeat against rivals Shamrock Rovers in the EA Sports Cup quarter final and this turned out to be his final appearance for Pats as he requested that his contract was terminated by mutual consent in search of first team football.

Bromley
In September 2012, following his departure from St Patrick's Athletic, the young midfielder signed for English Conference South side Bromley.

Dulwich Hamlet
After featuring in a pre-season friendly for Dulwich Hamlet against his former club Bromley, he signed for them in August 2013. He spent one season at the club, moving on at the end of the 2013–2014 Isthmian League Premier Division Season, during which he made a total of 40 appearances and scored 12 goals in all competitions.

Cray Wanderers
Following his release from Dulwich Hamlet, Daly signed with Cray Wanderers ahead of the 2014–15 Isthmian League North Division season.

International career
Daly is an Ireland U21 International, having scored on his U21 debut on 3 March 2010 in a UEFA U21 European Championship qualifier against Armenia U21s. The game ended in a 2–1 defeat for Ireland.

Previously, Daly made appearances as the leading scorer for Ireland's U-15, U-16, U-17, U-18 and U-19 teams. In March 2007, he scored two goals when representing the Ireland U-17 team in their victory over Scotland in Germany during their first game at the UEFA European Under-17 qualification

Honours
St Patrick's Athletic
Leinster Senior Cup (1): 2011

Career statistics 
 Professional appearances – correct as of 5 July 2012

References

1990 births
Living people
Republic of Ireland association footballers
Expatriate footballers in Greece
Expatriate footballers in Spain
Republic of Ireland expatriate association footballers
Home Farm F.C. players
Manchester City F.C. players
Aris Thessaloniki F.C. players
Cádiz CF players
St Patrick's Athletic F.C. players
Super League Greece players
League of Ireland players
A Championship players
Association footballers from County Dublin
Association football forwards
Association football midfielders
People educated at Coláiste Eoin